Sitta von Reden (born 1962 in Hannover) is a German ancient historian and Professor of Ancient History at the Albert-Ludwigs-Universität, Freiburg. She is particularly known for her research on  ancient economics, and the social and cultural history of the Graeco-Roman world.

Education and career 

Von Reden studied economics and history at the Albert-Ludwigs-Universität, Freiburg (graduating in 1987), and then studied Classical Philology and History at the Free University Berlin and the University of Cambridge. Von Reden received her doctorate in Ancient History at the University of Cambridge. She was Junior Research Fellowship at The Queen's College, Oxford. The dissertation, completed in 1993, was awarded by the Hellenic Foundation in Oxford.

Following several years of teaching and research at various British universities, von Reden habilitated in 2005 at the University of Augsburg with the thesis Monetization in 3rd -century BC Egypt and she subsequently taught Ancient History at the University of Augsburg, the Westfälische Wilhelms-Universität Münster and the Ludwig-Maximilians-Universität München. From 2013-2014 von Reden was based at the Institute for Advanced Study in Princeton.

Since April 1, 2010, von Reden has been Professor of Ancient History with a focus on Greek History at the Albert-Ludwigs-Universität Freiburg. She currently holds the position of Dean at the University College Freiburg.

Von Reden's 2010 publication, Money in Classical Antiquity, has been described as "admirable introduction to some of the main themes in current debates on the use of money in the Classical world".

In March 2017, Reden received an Advanced Grant from the European Research Council (ERC) for her project Beyond the Silk Road, endowed with €2.5 million.

Publications 
1995. Exchange in Ancient Greece. Duckworth, London, .
1998. Paul Cartledge, Paul Millett, Sitta von Reden (ed.): Kosmos: Essays in Order, Conflict and Community in Classical Athens. Cambridge University Press, Cambridge, .
2002. Walter Scheidel, Sitta von Reden (ed.): The Ancient Economy. Edinburgh University Press, Edinburgh, .
2007. Money in Ptolemaic Egypt. Cambridge University Press, Cambridge, .
2010. Money in Classical Antiquity. Cambridge University Press, Cambridge.
2015. Die Antike Wirtschaft. (= Encyclopedia of Greco-Roman Antiquity, Volume 10). de Gruyter Oldenbourg, Berlin et al. .
2016. Money and Prices in the Papyri, Ptolemaic Period. Oxford Handbooks Online

References 

1962 births
Living people
German numismatists
Historians of antiquity
Alumni of the University of Cambridge
German classical scholars
Women numismatists
Fellows of The Queen's College, Oxford